Amref International University  is located in Nairobi in Kenya.It is run by Amref Health Africa

The University is an accredited institution of higher learning focused on health sciences.

It is founded on the experience and intellect of Amref Health Africa which is reputed with over 60 years of quality and innovative community health, health systems management and development interventions.

Its predecessor, the Amref International Training Centre (AITC) has shaped Public and Community Health training and nurtured health leaders and practitioners in Africa over 40 years.

The vision of AMIU is to be a leading Health Sciences University of excellence in developing transformational health leaders and practitioners who inspire lasting health change in Africa.

References

External links

Universities and colleges in Kenya
Educational institutions established in 2017
2017 establishments in Kenya